Brawlout is a fighting game developed and published by Angry Mob Games for Microsoft Windows, Nintendo Switch, PlayStation 4, and Xbox One. The game was revealed at EVO in July 2016, and went into closed beta in December 2016. The game was initially released as early access for Microsoft Windows on April 20, 2017. Various outlets, such as Engadget, have compared Brawlout to the Super Smash Bros. series.

Angry Mob Games partnered with UK publisher Merge Games to release physical retail copies for the Nintendo Switch in May 2018.

Gameplay
Brawlout is a platform fighter in which two to four players fight against each other, in an environment with various platforms. The game features 25 playable characters, including 4 guest fighters. Characters use a variety of fighting moves and special attacks. Each attack does damage, increasing the opponent's damage percent. When the damage increases, the victim flies further. The purpose of each battle is to throw one's opponents off the stage.

Brawlout does not use blocking, and most characters are incapable of grabbing others. Instead, its gameplay is based on combos. Fighting builds up the player's Rage Meter, which fuels powerful special attacks, and adds an extra layer of strategy, by triggering the Combo Breaker or Rage Mode.

Playable Characters

 Acolyte
 Apucalypse
 Apunaut
 Chief Feathers
 Condor X
 Dead Cells 
 Dr. Tysonstein
 Funkmaster
 Gancho Puncho
 Juan Aguacate 
 King Apu
 Mako 
 Natu’ra
 Nightma’ra
 Olaf/Tyson
 Ooga/Tooga
 Paco
 Ripjack
 Senator Feathers
 Sephi’ra
 Sting’ra
 The Drifter 
 Vandal
 Volt
 Yooka-Laylee 

 Guest character

Online modes
Brawlout was designed for both couch and online play, with 2-4 player quick matches, ranked ladders, private lobbies, and Brawlout TV for watching live matches and featured replays and for making live tournaments easier to stream.

Reception

Brawlout has sold over 50,000 copies on the Nintendo Switch. The game won the award for "Game, Original Fighting" at the National Academy of Video Game Trade Reviewers Awards.

The Nintendo Switch, Xbox One, and PlayStation 4 versions of the game have received "mixed or average reviews" according to review aggregate site Metacritic.

References

External links
 

2017 video games
Crossover fighting games
Early access video games
Esports games
Indie video games
Video games with 2.5D graphics
Multiplayer and single-player video games
Platform fighters
Fighting games
Nintendo Switch games
PlayStation 4 games
Xbox One games
Video games developed in Romania
Windows games